not to be confused with Watch What Happens Live with Andy Cohen
Watch What Happens! is an album by American jazz pianist and composer Steve Kuhn recorded in 1968 and originally released on the MPS label but rereleased in the US as In Europe; 1968 on the Prestige label in 1969.

Reception
The Allmusic review by Ken Dryden awarded the album 4 stars, stating: "Like many pianists, Steve Kuhn seems to put out one quality disc after another but doesn't ever seem to get the attention he deserves. This beautifully recorded studio date from 1968, with bassist Palle Danielsson and drummer Jon Christensen, is a good example".

Track listing
All compositions by Steve Kuhn except as indicated
 "Watch What Happens" (Michel Legrand) - 2:49  
 "Silver" - 2:16  
 "Lament/Once We Loved" (J. J. Johnson/Gary McFarland) - 6:55  
 "Tom Jones" (John Addison, Mack Davis) - 6:42  
 "Windows of the World/Here I Am" (Burt Bacharach, Hal David) - 4:17  
 "I Fall in Love Too Easily" (Jule Styne, Sammy Cahn) - 4:04  
 "Ad Infinitum" (Carla Bley) - 9:14

Personnel
Steve Kuhn - piano
Palle Danielsson - bass
Jon Christensen - drums

References

MPS Records albums
Steve Kuhn albums
1968 albums
Prestige Records albums